Titu Ambani is a 2022 Indian Hindi language social drama film produced by  Mahendra Vijaydan Detha and Dinesh Kumar under the banner of Sabal productions.The film is directed, story and screenplay by Rohit Raj Goyal. Television actress Deepika Singh will mark her Bollywood debut with Titu Ambani.

Cast

 Tushar Pandey as Titu
 Deepika Singh as Mosmi
 Raghubir Yadav as Shukla Ji
 Pritam Jaiswal as Kuku                                                                                                                                                                               
 Virendra Saxena as Narendra Trivedi
 Sapna Sand  as Prabhavati Shukla
 Samta Sagar  as Sugandha Trivedi
 Brijendra Kala  as Sajan Chaturvedi
 Vibhor Sharma as Amrit Gupta

Soundtrack 

The film's soundtrack was composed by Bharat-Hitarth while lyrics are written by Mayur Puri.

References

External links 
 Titu Ambani at IMDb
 https://www.bollywoodhungama.com/movie/titu-ambani/
 https://www.filmibeat.com/bollywood/movies/titu-ambani/cast-crew.html
 https://www.cinestaan.com/movies/titu-ambani-50562/technical-specifications
 https://www.movietalkies.com/movies/titu-ambani/cast/
 https://www.koimoi.com/movie/titu-ambani/

2022 drama films
2020s Hindi-language films
2022 films
Indian drama films